The abbreviation GBFC may refer to one of the following football clubs:

 Galway Bohemians F.C.
 Gosport Borough F.C.
 Greenwich Borough F.C.
 Grimsby Borough F.C.